Šarlince may refer to:

 Šarlince (Doljevac), a village in Serbia
 Šarlince (Leskovac), a village in Serbia